The Law of Return (ḥok ha-shvūt) is an Israeli law, passed on 5 July 1950, which gives Jews, people with one or more Jewish grandparent, and their spouses the right to relocate to Israel and acquire Israeli citizenship. Section 1 of the Law of Return declares that "every Jew has the right to come to this country as an oleh [immigrant]". In the Law of Return, the State of Israel gave effect to the Zionist movement's "credo" which called for the establishment of Israel as a Jewish state. In 1970, the right of entry and settlement was extended to people with at least one Jewish grandparent and a person who is married to a Jew, whether or not they are considered Jewish under Orthodox interpretations of Jewish law.

On the day of arrival in Israel, or occasionally at a later date, a person who enters Israel under the Law of Return as an oleh would receive a certificate confirming their oleh status. The person then has three months to decide whether they wish to become a citizen and can renounce citizenship during this time. The right to an oleh certificate may be denied if the person is engaged in anti-Jewish activity, is a hazard to the public health or security of the state, or has a criminal past that may endanger public welfare.

History

The Law of Return was passed unanimously by the Knesset, Israel's Parliament, on 5 July 1950. The date chosen so that it would coincide with the anniversary of the death of Zionist visionary Theodor Herzl. It declared:

"Every Jew has the right to come to this country as an oleh."

In a declaration to the Knesset, the then Israeli prime minister David Ben-Gurion asserted that the law did not bestow a right but rather reaffirmed a right Jews already held:

"This law does not provide for the State to bestow the right to settle upon the Jew living abroad; it affirms that this right is inherent in him from the very fact of being a Jew; the State does not grant the right of return to the Jews of the diaspora. This right  the State; this right  the State; its source is to be found in the historic and never broken connection between the Jewish people and the homeland."

Follow-up legislation on immigration matters was contained in the Nationality Law of 1952.

Originally, the rights under the Law of Return applied only to Jews. However, due to an inability on the lawmakers to agree on a definition of who is a Jew, the Law did not define the term, relying instead on the issue to resolve itself over time. As a result, the Law relied in effect on the traditional halakhic definition. But, the absence of a definition of who is a Jew, for the purpose of the Law, resulted in divergent views of the various streams of Judaism competing for recognition.

Those who immigrate to Israel under the Law of Return are immediately entitled to citizenship in Israel. However, differences of opinion have arisen as to whether a person who claims citizenship under the Law of Return should be automatically registered as "Jewish" for census purposes. According to the halakhic definition, a person is Jewish if his or her mother is Jewish, or if he or she converts to Judaism. Orthodox Jews do not recognize conversions performed by Reform or Conservative Judaism.  However, the Law provides that any Jew regardless of affiliation may migrate to Israel and claim citizenship.

Jewish ancestry amendment
The Law of Return was amended in 1970 to extend the right of return to some non-Jews. Amendment number 2, 4a, states:

The law since 1970 applies to the following groups:
 Those born Jews according to the orthodox interpretation; having a Jewish mother or maternal grandmother.
 Those with Jewish ancestry – having a Jewish father or grandfather. 
 Converts to Judaism (Orthodox, Reform, or Conservative denominations—not secular—though Reform and Conservative conversions must take place outside the state, similar to civil marriages).
 But Jews who have converted to another religion are not eligible to immigrate under the Law of Return, even though they are still Jews according to halakha.

The 1970 amendment was induced by the debate on "Who is a Jew?". Until then the law did not refer to the question. There are several explanations for the decision to be so inclusive. One is that as the Nuremberg Laws did not use a halakhic definition in its definition of "Who is a Jew", the Law of Return definition for citizenship eligibility is not halakhic either. Another explanation is the 1968 wave of immigration from Poland, following an antisemitic campaign by the government. These immigrants were very assimilated and had many non-Jewish family members.

A second explanation is that in order to increase immigration levels so as to offset the "demographic threat" posed by the growth of the Arab population, the law expanded the base group of those eligible to immigrate to Israel.

A third explanation promoted by religious Jews is that the overwhelmingly secular leadership in Israel sought to undermine the influence of religious elements in Israeli politics and society by allowing more secular Jews and their non-Jewish spouses to immigrate.

The Israeli Rabbinate is a purely Orthodox body that is far more strict in defining 'who is a Jew'. This creates a situation in which thousands of immigrants who are eligible for citizenship under the Law of Return's criteria, are ineligible for Jewish marriage by the Israeli Rabbinate.

As of 2021, 3,340,000 Jews have immigrated to Israel since its independence in 1948.
Hundreds of thousands of people who do not have Jewish status under Orthodox Jewish interpretations of Halacha received Israeli citizenship, as the law confers citizenship to all offspring of a Jew (including grandchildren) and their spouses.

Denial of citizenship
Section 2(b) of the Law of Return empowers the Minister of Interior to deny Israeli citizenship under the Law of Return on a number of grounds. For example, an applicant may be denied citizenship if he or she is considered a threat to the security of the State of Israel (e.g. treason against the Jewish State), or who has a past criminal record involving a serious crime, such as murder, and poses a danger to the well-being of the State of Israel; or, for example, may be a fugitive in another country for any felony (unless they are persecution victims); or such persons who, by virtue of their illness, may pose a serious public health risk to the people of Israel; as also any person who may be actively engaged in any campaign that vociferously speaks out against the Jewish people and undermines their cause (such as demagoguery).

This provision has been used to exclude applicants a handful of times since Israel's establishment. Notable cases include Robert Soblen, an American Communist who spied for the Soviet Union and fled to Israel in an attempt to escape a life sentence; Meyer Lansky, an American mobster who was initially granted entry to Israel but was expelled two years later; and Victor Vancier, an American Kahanist activist convicted of involvement in a series of bombings.

In 1962 the case of Oswald Rufeisen, born a Polish Jew and later a Catholic convert, came before the Israeli Supreme court. The Supreme Court decided that "no one can regard an apostate as belonging to the Jewish people".

The granting of citizenship under the Law of Return does not prevent a person being extradited back to another country under an extradition treaty with that other country.

Controversy

Followers of Messianic Judaism
The Supreme Court of Israel ruled in 1989 that Messianic Judaism constituted another religion, and that people who had become Messianic Jews were not therefore eligible for Aliyah under the law.

On April 16, 2008, the Supreme Court ruled in a case brought by a number of people with Jewish fathers and grandfathers whose applications for citizenship had been rejected on the grounds that they were Messianic Jews. The argument was made by the applicants that they had never been Jews according to halakha, and were not therefore excluded by the conversion clause.  This argument was upheld in the ruling, and the government agreed to reprocess their applications. Despite this, Messianic Jews are considered to be eligible for the law if they can claim Jewish ancestry (having a Jewish father or grandfather).

Claims of discrimination in relation to Palestinian refugees
Critics claim that the Law of Return runs counter to the claims of a democratic state.

Palestinians and advocates for Palestinian refugee rights criticize the Law of Return, which they compare with the Palestinian claim to a Palestinian right of return. These critics consider the Law, as contrasted against the denial of the right of return, offensive and institutionalized ethnic discrimination.

A report by the UN Economic and Social Commission for Western Asia (ESCWA) slammed the Law of Return, "conferring on Jews worldwide the right to enter Israel and obtain Israeli citizenship regardless of their countries of origin and whether or not they can show links to Israel-Palestine, while withholding any comparable right from Palestinians, including those with documented ancestral homes in the country," as a policy of "demographic engineering" meant to uphold Israel's status as "the Jewish state". The report was later withdrawn following controversy.

Same-sex relationships
On June 10, 2011, the Law of Return was tested when a gay male couple, one Jewish and one Catholic, made Aliyah to Israel. This couple was the first same-sex, different religion married couple to request joint Aliyah status, although opposite sex married couples of different religions receive joint Aliyah as a matter of course. The Jewish man quickly received citizenship but the decision of citizenship for his husband was delayed by the Ministry of the Interior despite the clause in the law saying the spouse of the Jewish returnee must also be granted citizenship. On August 10, 2011, the Ministry of the Interior granted citizenship to the non-Jewish husband as required by The Law of Return.

In 2014, Interior Minister Gideon Sa'ar announced that Jews in same-sex relationships who got married abroad but wished to immigrate to Israel were allowed to do so under the Law of Return, even with a non-Jewish spouse, and that both spouses would receive Israeli citizenship.

Support for the Law of Return

Supporters of the law say that it is very similar to those in many European states, which also employ an ethnic component.

Supporters argue that:

 The Law of Return is not the only way of acquiring citizenship. For example, non-Jews can become citizens by naturalization, residence, or marrying an Israeli citizen. Naturalization, for instance, is available under certain circumstances for the non-Jewish parents of a citizen who has completed his or her army service.
 The right granted to Jews along with their relatives under the Law does not necessarily or automatically discriminate against non-Jews, but is a form of "positive" discrimination. Israel has residency and citizenship laws for non-Jews that are equivalent to those in other liberal democracies. Committee for Accuracy in Middle East Reporting in America (CAMERA) argues that the Law of Return is consistent with Convention on the Elimination of All Forms of Racial Discrimination Article I(3), which CAMERA says allows for preferential immigration treatment of some groups without discrimination against a particular group. Thus, CAMERA and others argue that other countries, including Germany, provide immigration privileges to individuals with ethnic ties to these countries (See Right of return and Repatriation laws).
 While the purpose of the Law of Return is perhaps to keep Israel predominantly Jewish, an argument states that a world where Jews have been persecuted, the concept of maintaining a Jewish state is necessary for the survival of the Jewish people generally and to provide a safe haven for Jewish refugees in specific cases. CAMERA argues the Law of Return is justified under the Convention on the Elimination of All Forms of Racial Discrimination Article I(4), which CAMERA argues allows for affirmative action, because of the discrimination Jews faced during the Holocaust. 
Benjamin Pogrund, director of Yakar's Center for Social Concern in Jerusalem and member of the Israeli delegation to the United Nations World Conference against Racism, calls the law "unfair" from the Palestinian refugees' point of view, but sees the unfairness as having happened in other places too. Pogrund compares the flight/expulsion of Palestinians (both in 1948 and 1967) to Germany, Poland, the Czech Republic, India and Pakistan.

Debate in Israel
Among Israeli Jews, continued Jewish immigration enjoys strong support. According to a 2016 poll conducted by Pew Forum 98% of all Jewish Israelis wanted the law to continue to allow Jewish immigration. However, some argue that the law permits the entry of too many non-Jews, undermining its purpose.

Support for the law among Israeli Arabs is much less. According to a poll overseen by Haifa University sociologist Sammy Smooha among 700 Jews and 700 Arabs conducted in 2017 only 25.2% "accepted" the Law of Return, down from 39% in 2015.

In September 2007, the discovery of a violent Israeli Neo-Nazi cell (Patrol 35) in Petah Tikva, made up of teenage immigrants from the former Soviet Union, led to renewed calls amongst politicians to amend the Law of Return.  Effi Eitam of the National Religious Party and the National Union, which represent the religious Zionist movement and have previously attempted to advance bills to amend the Law of Return, stated that Israel has become "a haven for people who hate Israel, hate Jews, and exploit the Law of Return to act on this hatred." On the other end of the political spectrum, MK Ahmed Tibi of United Arab List and Ta'al criticized the system's double standard, stating that "people immigrated to Israel and received automatic citizenship under the Law of Return, while citizens of Nazareth and Tayibe are not allowed to visit their own relatives merely due to the fact that they are Arabs."

Thirty-seven percent of Israelis polled said that deeper background checks on new immigrants would amount to racism against Jews from Russian-speaking countries.

Applicability of the law

Amongst those who are in favor of retaining the Law, controversy exists over its wording. The Law's definition of a "Jew" and "Jewish people" are subject to debate. Israeli and Diaspora Jews differ with each other as groups and among themselves as to what this definition should be for the purposes of the Law of Return. Additionally, there is a lively debate over the meaning of the terms "Jewish State" and "State of the Jews".

It is not only the Knesset, however, which has been repeatedly obliged to directly or indirectly address these issues. Over the years, many of Israel's interior ministers have examined the issue of the Law of Return and wavered as to how to apply it. The judiciary has also been called upon to express an opinion on matters relating to the Law. This burning and recurrent question in the country's political dialogue not only reveals but also exacerbates differences of opinion between Israelis.

One central issue is who has the authority over determining the validity of conversions to Judaism for purposes of immigration and citizenship. For historical reasons, the Chief Rabbinate of Israel, under the Israeli Ministry of Religious Affairs, made this determination, but this arrangement is in question. This practice has met opposition among non-Orthodox religious leaders both within Israel and in the diaspora. Several attempts have been made to resolve the issue, the most recent being the Ne'eman Commission, but an impasse persists.

On March 31, 2005, the Israeli Supreme Court ruled 7–4 that all conversions performed outside of Israel would be recognized by the authorities under the Law of Return, notwithstanding the Ne'eman Commission's view that a single body should determine eligibility for immigration. The court had already ruled in 1989 that conversions performed outside of Israel were valid for the Law of Return (regardless of whether they were Orthodox, Conservative, or Reform).  The 2005 ruling extended this, finding that overseas conversions were still valid even if the individuals did the preparatory work for the conversions while residing in Israel.

See also

Basic Laws of Israel
Prevention of Infiltration Law
Citizenship and Entry into Israel Law
Israeli identity card
Israeli passport
Politics of Israel
Oswald Rufeisen (Brother Daniel)

References

External links
The Law of Return – The text of the law and its various amendments
Democratic Norms, Diasporas, and Israel’s Law of Return by Alexander Yakobson and Amnon Rubinstein
 by Amnon Rubenstein, Ha'aretz

Zionism
Israeli immigration law
Israeli nationality law
1950 in law
1950 in international relations